The Province of Pesaro and Urbino is a province in the Marche region of Italy. Its capital is the city of Pesaro. It also borders the state of San Marino. The province is surrounded by San Marino and Emilia Romagna in the north, Umbria and Tuscany in the west, Ancona in the south and the Adriatic Sea on the east. The province has an enclave of the Umbrian commune of Citta' di Castello named Monte Ruperto. The province is also known as "Riviera of Hills". It is mostly covered by hills and is popular for its beaches. 

The ceramics museum and the Biblioteca Oliveriana are located in the capital city. 

The County Council is based in Pesaro while the headquarters of the provincial administration are in Urbino. 

The coat of arms of the province consists of a shield divided into two parts, each part is given the coat of arms of the two capitals. 

It has a robust economy with low unemployment, based on small and medium enterprises active in manufacturing, agriculture, tourism, other services. It has a very low per capita energy consumption. The small manufacturing industry contributes 22% of the province's GDP. Tourism in the province plays a primary role in the local economy; the main attractions are the coast and the Apennines. The beaches of Gabicce Mare, Pesaro, Fano and Marotta are the most famous ones.

The Lucus Pisaurensis, the Sacred Grove of Pisaurum, ancient Pesaro, is just outside modern Pesaro in the hamlet of Santa Venerada.

The province is also home to an unnamed Gallo-Italic language, yet some linguists named it Gallo-Piceno (Gallo-Picene).

History 
 
Early sources indicate a pre-Estruscan settlement in Pesaro.  The city was established as Pisaurum by the Romans in 184 BC as a colony of the Picentes, an early Italic people who lived on the northeast coast of Italy during the Iron Age.  In 1737, 13 ancient votive stones were unearthed in a local Pesaro farm field, each bearing the inscription of a semone or Roman god; these were written in a pre-Estrucan script, indicating a much earlier occupation of the area than the 184 BC Picentes colony.

After the fall of the Western Roman Empire, the area was absorbed in the Exarchate of Ravenna. In late mediaval times and early Renaissance it was the center of the county of Urbino, and later, the Duchy of Montefeltro. Later it was part of the Papal States and, from the late 19th century, of the Kingdom of Italy.
  
After the referendum of 2006, seven municipalities of Montefeltro were detached from the Province to join the Province of Rimini (Emilia-Romagna) on 15 August 2009. The municipalities are Casteldelci, Maiolo, Novafeltria, Pennabilli, San Leo, Sant'Agata Feltria and Talamello.

Local administrative subdivision 

There are 59 comunes (Italian: comuni) in the province.

As of May 31, 2005, the main comuni by population are:

References

External links 

 History of Pesaro, Italy

 
Pesaro and Urbino